Acme Packet was a company based in Bedford, Massachusetts that sold session border controllers (SBCs), multiservice security gateways (MSGs), and session routing proxies (SRPs) to service providers and enterprises. It was a public company incorporated in Delaware. Acme Packet employs over 761 individuals in 31 countries.

In 2002, Acme Packet Net-Net family of Session Aware Networking products won SUPERQuest award for most promising IP/application services technology for public networks at SUPERCOMM 2002.

On February 4, 2013, Oracle Corporation announced that it was to acquire Acme Packet for US$2.1 billion. The deal closed in June of 2013 and Acme Packet was folded into the Oracle Communications Global Business Unit.

Products
Acme Packet’s Net-Net product family consists of the Net-Net OS software platform, 2600, 3000, 4000 and 9000 series systems, 4000 ATCA blade, and the EMS and SAS management tools. The Net-Net OS can be configured to provide SBC, MSG or SRP functions on any of the hardware platforms. The brand name "Net-Net" reflects the role of these products in interconnecting IP networks for voice, video and multimedia services.

Acme Packet SBCs provide control functions to video and multimedia sessions—across IP network borders. They support multiple applications in service provider, large enterprise and contact center networks—from VoIP trunking to hosted enterprise and residential services to fixed-mobile convergence.

References

External links 
Acme Packet

Companies based in Bedford, Massachusetts
Oracle acquisitions
Companies formerly listed on the Nasdaq
Technology companies based in Massachusetts
2013 mergers and acquisitions